Jakup Jimmy Durmaz (born 22 March 1989), formerly known as Jimmy Touma, is a Swedish professional footballer who plays as a defensive midfielder or box-to-box midfielder for AIK. He began his career at BK Forward and moved in 2008 to Malmö FF, where he won the Allsvenskan title in 2010. He had two seasons each with Gençlerbirliği of Turkey and Olympiacos of Greece, winning two Superleague Greece titles and one Greek Cup. Durmaz made his senior international debut for Sweden in 2011. He was part of their squads for UEFA Euro 2016 and the 2018 FIFA World Cup.

Early life
Durmaz was born in Örebro, into an Assyrian family of the Syriac Orthodox faith. His father Semun is a Turkish-Syriac who migrated to Sweden from Midyat in southeastern Turkey, while his mother is a Lebanese-Syriac.

Club career

Malmö FF
Touma came to Malmö FF from BK Forward in July 2008. He made his Allsvenskan debut on 14 July 2008 against Hammarby IF. Prior to the 2009 season, he decided to switch his surname to Durmaz. His breakthrough came in the 2010 league winning season when he started in 15 games and played 27. Durmaz scored the opening goal against A.C. Milan in an exhibition game on 14 August 2011. Durmaz continued to the play regularly for the club during the 2011 season and finished the season with 27 league matches played and four goals scored.

Gençlerbirliği
In June 2012, Durmaz signed a three-year contract with Turkish club Gençlerbirliği S.K. During his time with the Ankara based side, Durmaz scored 11 times and provided six assists in 61 league appearances.

Olympiacos
After two seasons in Turkey, Durmaz signed for Greek Super League club Olympiacos Durmaz in August 2014. He scored his first goal for the club with a close-range effort against OFI Crete on 14 September. His first hat-trick came in an 8-0 win over Tyrnavos in a Greek Cup game on 29 January 2015.

Toulouse
Durmaz moved to Ligue 1 club Toulouse in August 2016, for a fee in the region of €2.5 million. On 26 August 2017, Durmaz scored two goals (both of them penalties) in Toulouse's 3–2 Ligue 1 home win over Stade Rennais to bring his 2017–18 Ligue 1 goal tally to three and improve on the two Ligue 1 goals he scored in the whole of the 2016–17 Ligue 1 season.

Galatasaray
On 2 July 2019, Durmaz joined reigning Süper Lig champions Galatasaray S.K. on a free transfer after his contract with Toulouse ran out. He signed on a three-year deal, earning 6 million Turkish lira for the first season, increasing by a million in each subsequent campaign.

Durmaz made his debut for the club in the Turkish Super Cup on 7 August 2019, playing 81 minutes in their 1–0 win over Akhisar.

Loan to Fatih Karagümrük 
On 2 October 2020, he signed a loan agreement with Fatih Karagümrük, one of the Super League teams.

AIK
On 12 January 2023, Durmaz signed a contract with AIK that will run until 31 December 2024.

International career
Durmaz made his debut for Sweden on 8 February 2011 in a friendly game against Cyprus. Durmaz was selected for the annual training camp for the Sweden national team in January 2012. The squad selection for the camp traditionally feature the best Swedish players in domestic and other Scandinavian leagues.

Durmaz represented Sweden at Euro 2016.

He was named in Sweden's 23-man squad for the 2018 FIFA World Cup in Russia, but only made one appearance in the tournament, coming on as a substitute against Germany in the group stage. After conceding a last-minute free kick in the game, from which Toni Kroos scored to beat Sweden 2–1, Durmaz was subjected to racial abuse and threats of violence on social media. Expert analysis found that the most abusive posts were almost all bot generated, rather than from genuine users.

Personal life
His younger brother Elias Durmaz is also a footballer, who plays fo the same team, AIK. Both brothers are midfielders.

Career statistics

Club

.

International

Appearances and goals by national team and year

International goals

Scores and results list Sweden's goal tally first.

Honours
Malmö
 Allsvenskan: 2010

Olympiacos
 Super League Greece: 2014–15, 2015–16
 Greek Cup: 2014–15

Galatasaray
Turkish Super Cup: 2019
Individual

 Stor Grabb: 2016

References

External links

Malmö FF profile 

 
 

Living people
1989 births
Assyrian footballers
Association football wingers
Malmö FF players
Gençlerbirliği S.K. footballers
BK Forward players
Olympiacos F.C. players
Toulouse FC players
Galatasaray S.K. footballers
Fatih Karagümrük S.K. footballers
AIK Fotboll players
Allsvenskan players
Ettan Fotboll players
Division 2 (Swedish football) players
Süper Lig players
Super League Greece players
Ligue 1 players
Expatriate footballers in Turkey
Expatriate footballers in Greece
Expatriate footballers in France
Swedish expatriate footballers
Swedish expatriate sportspeople in Turkey
Swedish expatriate sportspeople in Greece
Swedish expatriate sportspeople in France
Sweden under-21 international footballers
Sweden international footballers
UEFA Euro 2016 players
Syriac Orthodox Christians
2018 FIFA World Cup players
Swedish people of Assyrian/Syriac descent
Swedish people of Turkish descent
Swedish people of Lebanese descent
Sportspeople of Lebanese descent
Sportspeople from Örebro